Sahotas were a U.K. based Bhangra/Rock/World music band. The band, started in Bilston, Wolverhampton in the mid-1980s, had a line-up of five brothers. They have released music in both English and Punjabi.  The lead singer was Surj Sahota, and the music director/producer was Mukhtar Sahota.

The band's music is very different from conventional Punjabi music, combining the Bhangra genre with pop, house, reggae and rock, focusing on vocal styles and sounds. This transfusion occurred during the apex of Bhangra Music in the 1980s and 1990s when there was an abundance of Live British Asian Music across the United Kingdom; and when British Asian Music sought to be recognised by the mainstream music industry. The Sahotas were at the forefront of seeking this recognition, performing live on Cilla Black's Surprise, Surprise, Blue Peter, 8:15 from Manchester and Eggs 'n' Baker.  The Sahotas also joined Apache Indian on Carton TV's Soul Music and performed the soulful spiritual song "Urdaas" (Prayer).

The band were signed by Miles Copeland III's EMI Records, who at the time was Sting's Manager. The single "Out of Reach" and the album Right Time reached the UK Top 100, the first for a British Asian artist. This was closely followed by a nationwide tour with reggae band Aswad.

Sahotas toured in Africa, India, Pakistan, the US, Canada and Europe. Their hit songs include "Sahota Show Te Jake", "Hass Hogia", "Mahi Di Udeek", "Gal Bangaee", "Akhian Samaal", "Dang Ditha", "Sach", "Ajaa Ajaa Ajaa", "Dil Wich Tu Vasdi" and "Heerie".

The Sahotas' accolades include 'Best Band', 'Best Live Band' and 'Band of the Millennium' in the UK Bhangra Music industry. They were awarded platinum and gold discs for album sales.

The band's last release was their 7th bhangra album, Revolution in 2001; this album was a compilation of old hits released purely for the Indian and Pakistani music market.

Subsequently, the music producer from the band Mukhtar Sahota released a number of solo albums. Surj Sahota has worked with the band B21, Swedish Reggae band Urban Tribe, and Basil Gabbidon, the founder of Steel Pulse.

Discography
Albums

Extended plays

Singles

See also
Bhangra (music)
List of Bhangra Bands
Multitone Records
IRS Records
Rough Trade Records
Tips Music

References

External links 
 World Music Central page on Sahotas
 Official Sahotas Website
 Official Website: Surj Sahota of the Sahotas

Decade release date 1 January 1999 https://www.amazon.com/Decade-Sahotas/dp/B0019C99I2?keywords=decade+The+Sahotas&qid=1536770221&sr=8-1-spell&ref=mp_s_a_1_1

Bhangra (music) musical groups
Wolverhampton
Musical groups established in 1987
Musical groups from West Midlands (county)